Tarmo Reunanen (born 1 March 1998) is a Finnish professional ice hockey defenceman for Lukko of the Liiga. He was selected by the New York Rangers in the fourth round, 98th overall, of the 2016 NHL Entry Draft.

Playing career
Reunanen made his Liiga debut with TPS in the 2016–17 season. During the 2017–18 season, having produced 3 assists in 25 games with TPS, Reunanen was traded to fellow Finnish club Lukko on 18 January 2018. On 6 June 2019, Reunanen signed an entry-level contract with the New York Rangers. After the training camp for the 2019–20 season, the Rangers loaned Reunanen to Lukko. In October 2020, he was loaned to TUTO Hockey of the Finnish Mestis, and was then loaned to HPK of the Finnish Liiga in November 2020.

Reunanen started the 2020–21 season with the Hartford Wolf Pack, where he had two goals and three assists in eight games before being called up to the Rangers on 15 March 2021. He recorded an assist in his NHL debut against the Philadelphia Flyers on that day.

In the following 2021–22 season, Reunanen remained assigned by the Rangers to the Hartford Wolf Pack of the AHL. After matching his previous season totals with 17 points through 40 regular season games with the Wolf Pack, Reunanen was traded by the Rangers to the Carolina Hurricanes in exchange for Maxim Letunov on 28 March 2022. He was assigned to AHL affiliate, the Chicago Wolves for the remainder of the season.

On 29 June 2022, Reunanen opted to return to his homeland as an impending restricted free agent, signing a two-year contract with former club Lukko of the Liiga.

Career statistics

Regular season and playoffs

International

References

External links
 

1998 births
Living people
Chicago Wolves players
Finnish ice hockey defencemen
Hartford Wolf Pack players
HC TPS players
HPK players
Lukko players
New York Rangers draft picks
New York Rangers players
People from Äänekoski
SaPKo players
TuTo players
Sportspeople from Central Finland